Janet Quin-Harkin (born 24 September 1941, Bath, Somerset) is an author best known for her mystery novels for adults written under the name Rhys Bowen.

Career 
Before she began writing novels, Quin-Harkin worked in the drama department of the British Broadcasting Corporation in London and, later, for the Australian Broadcasting Corporation in Sydney, Australia. She also worked as a drama teacher and a dance teacher.

In 1981, she wrote one of the first six books with which Bantam launched the Sweet Dreams series.

In the 1990s Quin-Harkin began writing mystery novels for adults under the name Rhys Bowen. She has written three series under this name: one featuring British aristocrat Lady Georgiana ("Georgie") in 1930s England; one featuring Irish immigrant Molly Murphy working as a private detective in early 1900s New York City; and one featuring a Welsh police constable named Evan Evans.

She is also author of the Boyfriend Club series for young adults featuring four freshmen girls in Alta Mesa High School (Arizona): Roni, Ginger, Justine, and Karen.

Personal life 
Quin-Harkin graduated from the University of London in 1963. She moved to the United States when she married John Quin-Harkin.

She is the parent of four children. She now divides her time between Marin County, California, and Arizona.

Works as Janet Quin-Harkin 

 Peter Penny's Dance (Dial Press, 1976), picture book illustrated by Anita Lobel 
 Benjamin's Balloon (Parents Magazine, 1978), p.b. ill. Robert Censoni
 Septimus Bean and his Amazing Machine (Parents, 1979), p.b. illus. Art Cumings
 Magic Growing Powder (Parents, 1980), p.b. ill. Art Cumings
 Ten-boy summer (Bantam Books, 1982), Sweet Dreams Romance
 Helpful Hattie (Harcourt Brace Jovanovich, 1983), 58 pp., ill. Susanna Natti
 Wanted—date for Saturday night (1985)
  My Best Enemy (Bantam, 1987), Sweet Dreams Romance
 The boy next door (Bantam, 1995), Love Stories 4
 Who do you love? (Bantam, 1996), Love Stories 13
 Torn apart (Bantam, 1999), Love Stories 18
 Love potion (Avon Flare, 1999), Enchanted Hearts 4,

Works as Rhys Bowen

Constable Evan Evans series 
 Evans Above (1997)
 Evan Help Us (1998)
 Evanly Choirs (1999)
 Evan and Elle (2000)
 Evan Can Wait (2001)
 Evans to Betsy (2002)
 Evan Only Knows (2003)
 Evan's Gate (2004)
 Evan Blessed (2005)
 Evanly Bodies (2006)

Lady Georgiana "Georgie" series 
 Her Royal Spyness (2007)
 A Royal Pain (2008)
 Royal Flush (2009)
 Royal Blood (2010)
 Naughty in Nice (2011)
 The Twelve Clues of Christmas (2012)
 Heirs and Graces (2013)
 Queen of Hearts (2014)
  Malice at the Palace (2015)
  Crowned and Dangerous (2016)
  On Her Majesty’s Frightfully Secret Service (2017)
  Four Funerals and Maybe a Wedding (2018)
 Love and Death Among the Cheetahs (2019)
 The Last Mrs. Summers (2020)
 God Rest Ye, Royal Gentlemen (2021)
 Peril in Paris (November 2022)

Lady Georgiana short stories 

 Masked Ball at Broxley Manor (2012)

Molly Murphy series 
 Murphy's Law (2001)
 Death of Riley (2002)
 For the Love of Mike (2003)
 In Like Flynn (2005)
 Oh Danny Boy (2006)
 In Dublin's Fair City (2007)
 Tell Me, Pretty Maiden (2008)
 In a Gilded Cage (2009)
 The Last Illusion (2010)
 Bless the Bride (2011)
 Hush Now, Don't You Cry (2012)
 The Family Way (2013)
 City of Darkness and Light (2014)
 The Edge of Dreams (2015)
 Away in a Manger (2015)
 Time of Fog and Fire (2016)
 The Ghost of Christmas Past (2017)
 Wild Irish Rose (March 2022)

Molly Murphy short stories 
 The Amersham Rubies (2011)
 The Face in the Mirror (2013)
 Through the Window (2014)

World War I novels 
 The Victory Garden (2019)

World War II novels 
 In Farleigh Field (2017)
 The Tuscan Child (2018)
 The Venice Sketchbook  (2021)
  “Where the Sky Begins”

Anthologies and collections

Honors 
 2000 "The Seal of the Confessional" – finalist, Agatha and Anthony Awards
 2001 Murphy's Law – Agatha Award for Best Novel
 2002 Death of Riley – finalist, Agatha Award for Best Novel
 2004 "Doppelganger" – finalist, Anthony Award for best short story
 2007 "Oh Danny Boy - Macavity Award Sue Feder Memorial Award for Best Historical Novel
 2008 "Please Watch Your Step" - Macavity Award for best short story
 2009 "A Royal Pain - Macavity Award Sue Feder Memorial Award for Best Historical Novel
 2011 Naughty in Nice – Agatha Award for Best Historical Novel
 2017 In Farleigh Field - Agatha Award for Best Historical Novel, Left Coast Crime Lefty Award (Bruce Alexander Memorial Award for Best Historical Mystery), Macavity Award Sue Feder Memorial Award for Best Historical Novel

References

 External links 

 
 Interview by Claire E. White, The Internet Writing Journal'' (writerswrite.com/journal), 2001
 
 Rhys Bowen (pseudonym) at LC Authorities, with 39 records, and Bowen at WorldCat

British children's writers
English mystery writers
Living people
Anthony Award winners
Macavity Award winners
Agatha Award winners
1941 births
People from Bath, Somerset
Writers from San Francisco
Alumni of the University of London
Women mystery writers
Writers of historical mysteries
20th-century English novelists
20th-century British women writers
21st-century English novelists
21st-century British women writers